WJSU-FM (88.5 FM), is a NPR member station in Jackson, Mississippi, United States, owned by Jackson State University (JSU). Its studios are located separately from the main campus at the Mississippi e-Center at JSU, and its transmitter is atop JSU's administration building.

The station carries primarily jazz-related programs, with some NPR programming and local programs, plus R&B music on Saturday mornings and gospel music all day on Sundays.

HD Radio
WJSU offers HD radio with the HD2 channel stunting with a rebroadcast of the main channel. The channel launched in August 2021 and was taken off the air temporarily due to technical difficulties. It's currently unclear what the HD2 channel will broadcast.

See also
 List of jazz radio stations in the United States

External links 
WJSU official website
Jackson State University

NPR member stations
Jackson State University
Jazz radio stations in the United States
JSU-FM
Radio stations established in 1986
1986 establishments in Mississippi
JSU-FM